Anancylus malasiacus is a species of beetle in the family Cerambycidae. It was described by Stephan von Breuning in 1982. It is known from Borneo and Malaysia.

References

Mesosini
Beetles described in 1982